Ras association domain family member 7 is a protein that in humans is encoded by the RASSF7 gene.

References

Further reading